Ylitornio is a municipality of Finland.

Literally translated to English the two locations would be called Upper Tornio.

The municipality is unilingually Finnish in contrast to much of far-western Finland.  Finland is officially bilingual.

A unique ski flying hill project has been presented. The inruns of the hills will be through a mountain inside a pipe tunnel.

Notable people
Sami Jauhojärvi, skier
Jarkko Kauvosaari, ice hockey player
Toni Koivisto, ice hockey player

See also
Aavasaksa
Övertorneå, a municipality of Sweden

References

External links

Municipality of Ylitornio – Official website
Ylitornio Matkailu – Tourist site

 
Populated places established in 1809
Finland–Sweden border crossings